Martyn Skinner (24 August 1906 – 25 October 1993) was a British poet. He won the 1943 Hawthornden Prize for Letters to Malaya and the Heinemann Award in 1947, for the last volume of that title, or the entire collection.

Skinner was born in Fitzhead, Somerset, in southwest England.

According to John Clute, his "most ambitious works were two long narrative poems", or poem sequences. The Return of Arthur "is set in a Near Future England transformed into a totalitarian Dystopia; but a reborn Arthur from another Dimension returns, and the Matter of Britain is again told as the Millennium approaches". Old Rectory is set in a more distant "Ruined Earth Britain, where a hermit mage named Old Rectory decides to return to society and redeem it".

Skinner's correspondence with the novelist R. C. Hutchinson has been published as Two Men of Letters (1979), .

Poems 
 
 Sir Elfadore and Mabyna: A Poem in Four Cantos (1935), 
 Letters to Malaya (1941 to 1947)
 Two Colloquies (1949) – "The Lobster of the Thatch" and "The Recluse", 
 Merlin, or the Return of Arthur: A Satiric Epic (1951) Frederick Muller, London
 The Return of Arthur: A Poem of the Future (1955) Chapman & Hall, London
 The Return of Arthur: A Poem of the Future Part Two (1959) Chapman & Hall, London
 The Return of Arthur: A Poem of the Future (1951 to 1959); assembled and expanded 1966
 Old Rectory (1970 to 1977)
 Old Rectory, or the Interview (1984) Michael Russell, Salisbury

References

External links 

 "Skinner, Martyn",  The Encyclopedia of Fantasy (1997)
 
  – one of two WorldCat person pages for Skinner as of 2018-09-04; see also below

1906 births
1993 deaths